The pink-headed imperial pigeon (Ducula rosacea) is a species of bird in the family Columbidae found in the Lesser Sunda Islands of Indonesia. Its natural habitats are subtropical or tropical moist lowland forests, subtropical or tropical mangrove forests, and subtropical or tropical moist shrubland. It is threatened by habitat loss.

References

pink-headed imperial pigeon
Birds of the Lesser Sunda Islands
Birds described in 1835
Taxonomy articles created by Polbot